Central Hardin High School is a school located in Elizabethtown, Kentucky, United States. Although the school is within the city limits, it is served by the post office of the community of Cecilia, much of which has recently been annexed by Elizabethtown. It is one of three county high schools in the Hardin County School System.  The school is a school-based decision-making school.  The council of twelve members including two administrators, six teachers, and four parents began operation in December 1995.

History
Hardin Central Junior High was built and opened as a brand new school in 1976, Cletus Coats was the first principal. The name was reversed to Central Hardin and opened as a high school in fall of 1990. East and West Hardin High Schools became middle schools with their high school students going to the new Central Hardin High. Cletus Coats went to West to replace Dale Campbell who transferred to Central Hardin as Principal. Economy of the community is based on agriculture/farming, industry, service jobs, medical, small business and military. The community is served by Elizabethtown Community and Technical College. The community is very supportive of the school as 267 volunteers logged in 20,987 hours last year.

2008 tornado
During the early morning hours of February 6, 2008 a tornado ripped through the school, damaging the football field, freshman center, main gym, and main entrance.

School plant

Faculty and staff

Structure and schedule pattern

The school day begins at 8:25 am and ends at 3:30 pm. Schedules are divided into 3 trimesters of 5 classes each. Each trimester is approximately 12 weeks long.
Midday, students are allowed an hour lunch period, usually called "power hour." The expectation is for students to use this time to improve their grades and finish work they may have missed, in addition to eating lunch.

Students have a choice of over 140 offerings per year. 26 credits are required for graduation. In addition to the standard diploma, students may earn a Commonwealth Diploma by following an advanced curriculum and receiving credit in at least four advanced placement classes.

Athletics

Clubs and organizations

References

External links
 

Educational institutions established in 1990
Elizabethtown, Kentucky
Schools in Hardin County, Kentucky
Public high schools in Kentucky
1990 establishments in Kentucky